Chulat is a rural locality (a selo) in Tabasaransky District, Republic of Dagestan, Russia. The population was 1,309 as of 2010. There are 18 streets.

Geography 
Chulat is located 32 km southeast of Khuchni (the district's administrative centre) by road. Gyukhryag is the nearest rural locality.

References 

Rural localities in Tabasaransky District